These are the results of 2021 BWF World Senior Championships' 35+ events.

Men's singles

Seeds 

 Chao Chun-ken (quarter-finals)
 Boonsak Ponsana (bronze medalist)
 Manish Rawat (bronze medalist)
 Hsueh Hsuan-yi (silver medalist)
 Andrew Aspinal (quarter-finals)
 Niels Christian Blittrup (withdrew)
 Anthony Nelson (gold medalist)
 Mayank Behal (quarter-finals)

Finals

Top half

Section 1

Section 2

Bottom half

Section 3

Section 4

Women's singles

Seeds 

 Ava Monney (second round)
 Maya Dobreva (silver medalist)
 Dominika Cygan (second round)
 Parul Rawat (quarter-finals)

Finals

Top half

Section 1

Section 2

Bottom half

Section 3

Section 4

Men's doubles

Seeds 

 Niels Christian Blittrup / Casper Lund (quarter-finals)
 Naruenart Chuaymak / Rungsan Thipsotikul (second round)
 Prashant Bahatre / Manish Rawat (second round)
 Boonsak Ponsana / Jakrapan Thanathiratham (gold medalists)
 Abhishek Agarwal / Mahammad Danish Khan (third round)
 Andrew Aspinal / Mark Law (quarter-finals)
 Mark Burgeman / Howard Fisher (second round)
 Chao Chun-ken / Tsai Ming-hsin (bronze medalists)

Finals

Top half

Section 1

Section 2

Bottom half

Section 3

Section 4

Women's doubles

Seeds 

 Hélène Dijoux / Audrey Petit (bronze medalists)
 Gry Uhrenholt Hermansen / Helle Kæmpegaard (gold medalists)
 Sangeetha Mari / Sandhya Melasheemi (bronze medalists)
 Ava Monney /  Maily Turlan (quarter-finals)

Finals

Top half

Section 1

Section 2

Bottom half

Section 3

Section 4

Mixed doubles

Seeds 

 Tommy Sørensen / Gry Uhrenholt Hermansen (gold medalists)
 Niels Christian Blittrup / Tanja Blittrup (second round)
 Andrew Aspinal / Suzanne Brewer (quarter-finals)
 Plamen Mihalev / Maya Dobreva (quarter-finals)
 Anthony Nelson / Maily Turlan (silver medalists)
 Abhinand K. Shetty / Sangeetha Mari (bronze medalists)
 Sunil Gladson Varadaraj / Radhika Ingalhalikar (quarter-finals)
 Casper Lund /  Maren Formo (quarter-finals)

Finals

Top half

Section 1

Section 2

Bottom half

Section 3

Section 4

References 
Men's singles
Women's singles
Men's doubles
Women's doubles
Mixed doubles

2021 BWF World Senior Championships